The men's 10 metre platform, also reported as platform diving, was one of four diving events on the Diving at the 1992 Summer Olympics programme.

The competition was split into two phases:

 Preliminary round
 The twelve divers with the highest scores advanced to the final.
 Final
 Divers performed a set of dives to determine the final ranking.

Results

See also 
 1991 World Championships Men's 10 m Platform

References

Sources 
 

Men
Men's events at the 1992 Summer Olympics